Tatar Mongols may refer to:

Mongols
Tatars
The Golden Horde